Hills Creek is a name found in several places in the United States.

In Tioga County, Pennsylvania:
Hills Creek State Park, a Pennsylvania State Park in Tioga County 
Hills Creek, a tributary of the Tioga River in Tioga County, Pennsylvania
Hills Creek, a stream in Alabama
Hills Creek, a stream in West Virginia
Hills Creek, a stream in Oregon
Hills Creek, there are two streams in California with this name.
Hills Creek, a stream in Georgia